Som Dutt Plaza is a Non-AC Mall (marketing complex) situated adjacent to Naveen Market along the famous Mall Road in the city of Kanpur nagar, Uttar Pradesh. It shares the same complex with Hotel Landmark.

Buildings and structures completed in 1987
Buildings and structures in Kanpur
Economy of Kanpur
20th-century architecture in India